Khorasaniha Synagogue is a synagogue located in the Zartosht street in Valiasr street in Tehran, Iran.

History 
In 1349 SH (1970–1971 AD) Mashhadi Jews often used the Levian Synagogue. However, with an increase in Mashhadi Jewish population the need for a separate synagogue increased. With the help of several other synagogues such as Levian, Yousefzadeh, and Rafie Nia, the land was purchased. Rabbi Eliahu ben Haim has been the chief Rabbi of the synagogue for many years.

References 

Synagogues in Tehran